Warne Out is an album by saxophonist Warne Marsh recorded in 1977 and released on the Interplay label.

Reception 

Allmusic called it, "An album where wit and inventiveness are the theme, from the title to the leads".

Track listing 
All compositions by Warne Marsh except where noted.
 "Loco 47" – 4:02
 "Liner Notes" – 5:05
 "Warne Out" – 3:45
 "Lennie's Pennies" (Lennie Tristano) – 4:05
 "Duet" – 4:32
 "Ballad" – 6:20
 "Warne Piece" – 5:02

Personnel 
Warne Marsh – tenor saxophone
Jim Hughart – bass
Nick Ceroli – drums

References 

Warne Marsh albums
1977 albums
Interplay Records albums